Harumi Honda (born 12 November 1963) is a Japanese former track cyclist.

Career 
Honda was the keirin world champion in 1987.

Major results
1987
1st  World Keirin Championships
1988
1st European Sprint Championships
1989
2nd European Sprint Championships

References

1963 births
Living people
Japanese male cyclists